Waraseoni tehsil is a fourth-order administrative and revenue division, a subdivision of third-order administrative and revenue division of Balaghat district of Madhya Pradesh.

Geography
Waraseoni tehsil has an area of 465.02 sq kilometers. It is bounded by Lalbarra tehsil in the northwest and north, Balaghat tehsil in the northeast, Kirnapur tehsil in the east and southeast and Khairlanji tehsil in the south and southwest and Katangi tehsil in the west.

See also 
Balaghat district

Citations

External links

Tehsils of Madhya Pradesh
Balaghat district